Technically speaking, Paraguayan law prohibits discrimination on grounds of gender, race, language, disability, or social status, but there is nonetheless widespread discrimination.

Under Paraguayan law, freedom of speech is technically guaranteed. The news media are independent and theoretically free to criticize the government, although political officials often sue the media for libel in order to put an end to undesirable investigations. Journalists are also frequently “subjected to harassment, intimidation, and violence – primarily from drug trafficking gangs and criminal syndicates based in departments bordering Brazil – due to their reporting.”  The government does not limit Internet access or academic freedom; freedom of assembly is restricted, with demonstrations allowed only at certain times and places.  Paraguayans may move freely around the country, travel or move abroad, and move back to Paraguay.  The country has accepted political refugees, mostly from Cuba.

Elections are free and fair, although unregistered parties and independent candidates are not allowed to  take part in national and departmental elections

Women's rights

Rape and domestic violence are major problems in Paraguay. Rape is punishable by up to 10 years in jail, but police are often hesitant to make arrests.  Domestic violence must be “habitual” to be considered criminal. Domestic-violence charges are often withdrawn owing to family pressure. Women technically enjoy equal rights but sexual discrimination, especially in employment and pay, is common and traditional.

Paraguayan law requires that in party primaries at least 20 percent of the candidates in each party must be women. There are women serving in most levels of government.

The Committee on the Elimination of Discrimination against Women called on Paraguay in 2011 to conduct “awareness-raising and public educational campaigns...with a view to bring about changes in traditional attitudes associated with discriminatory gender roles in the family and in society at large.”  It also suggested that the media and advertisers adopt a “code of conduct” with the goal of avoiding sexual stereotypes and preventing gender discrimination.  The committee also called for more vigorous prosecution of perpetrators of violence against women and intensified efforts to raise awareness throughout Paraguay of the inappropriateness of such activity.  It also urged Paraguay to set quotas to ensure increased participation by women in politics and diplomacy.

The UN Human Rights Committee called on Paraguay in 2006 to “ensure that legislation protecting against gender discrimination is enforced and that the institutions created for that purpose are adequately financed for effective operation.” It also asked Paraguay “to ensure equal working conditions for men and women and to increase participation by women in all areas of public and private life.” As for Paraguay's “restrictive abortion laws,” the committee asked Paraguay to “take effective action to reduce infant and maternal mortality by, inter alia, revising its legislation on abortion ...and ensuring that contraceptives are available to the general public, especially in rural areas.”

Migrants' rights

The Committee on the Protection of the Rights of All Migrant Workers and Members of Their Families recommended in 2012 that Paraguay “strengthen its institutional structure for dealing with migration-related issues” and “establish a coordination mechanism with a view to improving services for migrant workers and their families while, at the same time, working to ensure its compliance with and the uniformity of regional and international treaties to which Paraguay is party.” The committee also urged Paraguay to take more serious steps to combat human trafficking.

Indigenous people's rights

Paraguay is a signatory of Convention 169 Indigenous and Tribal People's Convention of the
International Labour Organization (ILO) and of the UN Declaration on the Rights of Indigenous Peoples (UNDRIP). The rights of indigenous people are supposed to be safeguarded by the National Institute of the Indigenous (INDI), the Public Ministry, and the Ombudsman's Office. Nonetheless, discrimination against indigenous persons is widespread, and such persons' rights, especially their property rights, are often violated by authorities. Although indigenous people are permitted to serve in government, moreover, there are no such persons in any higher-level government position.

As Amnesty International put it in a 2012 report, there is “wide international recognition of the fact that Indigenous Peoples in Paraguay suffer serious and systematic violation of their rights.” The Committee on Economic, Social and Cultural Rights (CESCR), the UN Permanent Forum on Indigenous Issues, the ILO, the UN Special Rapporteur on Indigenous Peoples, and the Inter-American Commission and Court of Human Rights have all expressed concern about the land rights of indigenous people in Paraguay; such groups as Tierraviva, CODEHUPY, the Catholic Bishops’ Conference and the Coordinator for the Self-Determination of Indigenous Peoples (Coordinadora por la Autodeterminación de los Pueblos Indígenas, CAPI) have criticized indigenous people's displacement from their tribal lands. Also, the National Federation of Workers (Confederación Nacional de Trabajadores, CNT) has criticized the failure to consult indigenous persons on laws affecting their rights.

The UN Committee on the Elimination of Racial Discrimination called on Paraguay in 2012 to protect indigenous people's rights, especially land claims.  In the same year, Amnesty International suggested that “approving and implementing anti-discrimination legislation that adheres to international human rights standards would play an important role in promoting Indigenous Peoples’ rights and in requiring concrete actions to uphold them.”

Children's rights

Paraguayan nationality is acquired by being born in Paraguay, or to citizens temporarily living abroad, or government employees serving abroad. A 2010 report by the UN Committee on the Rights of the Child complained that many children in Paraguay, however, are unregistered.

Child abuse and neglect are widespread, as is child labor. The U.S. Department of Labor's List of Goods Produced by Child Labor or Forced Labor reported 5 goods produced under such working conditions in Paraguay. These included the production of bricks, the quarrying of stone, the production of cotton and sugarcane as well as pornography. The National Commission to Prevent and Eradicate the Exploitation of Children, the Secretariat for Children and Adolescents (SNNA), and the Integral Adolescent Attention Service seek to protect children and adolescents from abuse. There are hostels, shelters, and children's homes and orphanages around the country.

A major problem is the sexual exploitation of children, many of whom work as prostitutes.  Adults who pimp out child prostitutes are punishable by up to eight years.  For opposite-sex statutory rape, the maximum penalty is a fine; for same-sex statutory rape, a prison sentence. These laws are not vigorously enforced, however.

The UN Human Rights Committee called on Paraguay in 2006 “to ensure respect for children's rights, including urgent steps to eradicate child labour.”   An extensive 2010 report by the UN Committee on the Rights of the Child made a series of urgent proposals regarding the human rights of children in Paraguay, including calls for major improvement in official approaches to the abuse, sexual exploitation, and trafficking of children, in the prevention of child labour, and in children's access to health care, education, and proper nutrition.

Paraguay is a signatory of the 1980 Hague Convention on the Civil Aspects of International Child Abduction.

Rights of persons with disabilities

Technically it is illegal in Paraguay to discriminate against disabled people, but discrimination is widespread, and there is no law requiring buildings or transport to be wheelchair accessible. For this reason most disabled children are unable to attend school. A law requires 5 percent of government jobs to be filled by disabled persons, but in practice fewer than one percent of such jobs are held by persons with disabilities.

LGBT rights

Officially, discrimination against gays is illegal, though discrimination is widespread, and government officials often ignore the law in practice. LGBT groups operate freely, and the government issues permits and provides security for gay-pride marches. Even though the state provides security for gay-pride marches and gatherings recently these marches and gatherings have led to clashes between the police and the paraders that have accused the government of discriminating them after some homophobic statements made by Colorado and UNACE congressmen.

Employee rights

Paraguayan law allows unions, strikes, and collective bargaining, and forbids binding arbitration. In practice, however, employers act with impunity against strikers and unions.  The law also prohibits
forced labor, but in practice it is widespread.  Labor by children under 14 is illegal, but it is actually widespread,  As of 2010, slightly over half of Paraguayan children between ages five and 17 are in employment, with the majority of them working over 14 hours a week. There are known to be slaves in Paraguay, especially among domestic servants; parents sell children to perform forced labor, smuggle drugs, and commit other crimes. Enforcement of laws against these activities is hampered by a lack of resources.

There is a minimum wage, but it is unenforced.  There is also a standard workweek, but violations abound.

Institutionalized corruption

Police officers are frequently involved in crime.  Paraguayan police have been described in a 2010 U.S.  State Department report as “poorly trained, inadequately funded, generally corrupt, and shielded by impunity.”  Policemen commit kidnappings, detain civilians in order to extort bribes, and conspire with prosecutors to commit blackmail and other crimes. The report refers to “routine incidents of police involvement in homicide, arms and narcotics trafficking, car theft, robbery, extortion, and kidnapping throughout the country, with such abuses particularly widespread in Ciudad del Este and other areas bordering Brazil.” Between 2008 and 2010, several police officers were arrested for or found guilty of various acts of murder and manslaughter. Some kidnappings have resulted in disappearances. Paraguayan law prohibits torture, but some police officers and other government officials engage in it anyway. The State Department report mentions that “some security forces and government prosecutors” in Paraguay, “acting in official capacity but without government knowledge or support,” may have “occasionally killed individuals for personal gain.”

Although candidates for public office are supposed to issue financial disclosures, many do not.  Extortion is common at many levels of Paraguayan society. Military officers have routinely extorted money from their subordinates, and Civil Registry Office officials have demanded money illegally for performing standard services.

In practice, official corruption is rarely punished.

Rights of prisoners

Paraguayan prisons are not up to international standards. Conditions have been described as “deplorable.”  Among the problems are “violence, mistreatment, overcrowding, inadequate and poorly trained staff, deteriorating infrastructure, unsanitary living conditions, poor food safety standards, and inadequate medical and psychological care.” Some inmates actually have weapons. Deaths while in custody are not uncommon. Certain prisoners demand bribes from visitors in order to arrange contact with the inmates they are visiting. As of 2010. about 30 percent of the inmates in Paraguayan prisons should, according to the country's constitution, have been released already but were still being held pending a judge's order. Inmates can receive better accommodations in exchange for regular payments.   In 2010, it was discovered that inmates in one prison were blackmailing underage girls to come to the prison to videotape sex acts. It was alleged that some prison officials, including the warden and clergy working in the prison, were involved in this activity.

Some juvenile offenders are imprisoned in adult prisons.  Paraguay permits the media, human-rights groups, the Red Cross, and other organizations to visit prisons and monitor conditions. A National Commission on Prison Reform was created in 2010.

A group of international human-rights organizations issued a statement in December 2012 denouncing 
“the health plight of 10 farmers who have been on a hunger strike for nearly two months after being arbitrarily detained in the prison of Coronel Oviedo, Caaguazú department, Paraguay.” The strikers were described as “part of a group of 54 people who have been arbitrarily charged with seven criminal charges including offense of murder, attempted murder, serious injury, criminal association, grave coercion, coercion and invasion.”  The statement listed a series of violations of Paraguayan law that had been made in connection with this case.

Human-rights ombudsman

The UN Committee on Torture called on Paraguay in 2011 to appoint a replacement for the nation's human-rights ombudsman, whose mandate had expired.  The committee also expressed concern that the office of ombudsman had insufficient resources, and called on Paraguay to “equip the Office of the
Ombudsman with sufficient financial, material and human resources to carry out its mandate effectively and independently, in accordance with the Paris Principles.”

References

  - Paraguay

External links
Freedom of expression in Paraguay - IFEX
 See the PARAGUAY page in the pro Justice and Democracy website Habeas-Corpus.net